Karl Christian Koch (born 3 April 1952) is a Danish former breaststroke swimmer. He competed in two events at the 1972 Summer Olympics.

References

External links
 

1952 births
Living people
Danish male breaststroke swimmers
Olympic swimmers of Denmark
Swimmers at the 1972 Summer Olympics
People from Sønderborg Municipality
Sportspeople from the Region of Southern Denmark